Bat Galim (lit. Daughter of the Waves) is a neighborhood of Haifa, Israel, located at the foot of Mount Carmel on the Mediterranean coast. Bat Galim is known for its promenade and sandy beaches. The neighborhood spans from Rambam hospital in the North to the Haifa Cable Cars in the South, and from the Mediterranean Sea's shore line in the West to Bat Galim's train station on the East.

History
Bat Galim was the first point of Jewish settlement in modern Haifa. The neighborhood was established in the 1920s as a garden suburb of private homes designed by the Bauhaus architect Richard Kauffmann. During the British Mandate, Bat Galim was Haifa's entertainment center. The "Casino," a landmark building on the Bat Galim promenade, housed a cafe patronized by British officers, although it was never used for gambling. It was also the center of water sports in the country, and a swimming pool was built there.

Landmarks

Rambam Medical Center, the Technion's Faculty of Medicine and the Rappaport Family Institute for Research in the Medical Sciences are situated in the north of Bat Galim, near the shore. Bat Galim and nearby neighborhoods are served by the Haifa Bat Galim railway station. Bat Galim is the lower station of the Haifa Cable Car, which runs up and down the Carmel from Stella Maris.

Demographics
Bat Galim is a mixed neighborhood consisting of families from many different nationalities and socio-economic backgrounds including Jewish families who lived there prior to WWII, hence there's a large elderly presence, many immigrants from the former Soviet Union and Christian and Muslim minorities. 
In the last several years, Bat Galim has seen an inception of medical students, both native and international, who come to study and intern at the Rambam hospital.  
The neighborhood also has an eclectic community with many self proclaimed artists and artisans who started an annual tradition where they open their homes to the public for a few days in September to showcase and sell their crafts which include hand-made pottery, glass art, jewelry, photographs and paintings of the neighborhood.  This annual event attracts people from all over the country and also features live music, entertainment for the kids, lectures, architectural tours of the city and a speech by the Mayor of Haifa.

Beach and surfing
Bat Galim is a popular location for surfers, including wave, wind and kite surfing, year round, with many international competitions taking place there. Among the surfers, there are many swimmers, with three supervised beaches along the shore including the popular "Lagoona" beach specifically for swimmers and the "Backdoor" beach for wave surfers. More recently, many new SUP, stand up paddle board enthusiasts have joined in the neighborhood's water sports.

References

Neighborhoods of Haifa
Geography of Israel